Oscar Mammì (25 October 1926 – 10 June 2017) was an Italian politician. A member of the Italian Republican Party (Partito Repubblicano Italian, or PRI), he was minister of Mail and Telecommunications from 1987 to 1991.

Biography
Mammì was born in Rome and graduated in Economics and Trade. He was elected for PRI in the Italian Chamber of Deputies for the first time in 1972. After having been undersecretary of Industry and Trade, he was first Minister of Parliamentary Relations in the Craxi I and Craxi II Cabinets, and later Minister of Mail and Telecommunications in the Goria, De Mita and Andreotti VI Cabinets.

His name is connected with the so-called "Mammì Bill", issued in 1990, which was the first Italian comprehensive law dealing with media and TV and Radio advertisement. The law was accused of granting a substantial monopoly on public television to Silvio Berlusconi. The Italian Constitutional Court later in 1994 as anti-constitutional a comma of the law  which allowed Berlusconi to own three TV networks; however, there was no measure to change the situation afterwards

In 2005 he played in a TV fiction on Rai 3 Italian state channel.

Mammi died on 10 June 2017 at the age of 90.

References

Sources
Biography at Italian TV & Radio History website 

1926 births
2017 deaths
Politicians from Rome
Italian Republican Party politicians
Government ministers of Italy
Deputies of Legislature V of Italy
Deputies of Legislature VI of Italy
Deputies of Legislature VII of Italy
Deputies of Legislature VIII of Italy
Deputies of Legislature IX of Italy
Deputies of Legislature X of Italy
Italian male actors